Erligheim is a municipality in the district of Ludwigsburg in Baden-Württemberg in Germany.

History
The villages Erligheim and Bönnigheim were donated to Lorsch Abbey in 793. In 1574, Erligheim was broken per Ganerbschaft into quarters that eventually came into the possession of the Elector of Mainz. When Oberamt Besigheim was dissolved in 1938, it was replaced with the newly organized Landkreis Ludwigsburg, to which Erligheim was assigned.

Geography
The municipality (Gemeinde) of Erligheim is located in the district of Ludwigsburg, in Baden-Württemberg, one of the 16 States of the Federal Republic of Germany. Elevation above sea level in the municipal area ranges from a high of  Normalnull (NN) to a low of  NN.

Politics
Erligheim has one borough (Ortsteil), Erligheim, one village, Lange Äcker, and one abandoned village, Birlingen.

Coat of arms
Erligheim's coat of arms shows a green adler tree rooted to a field of white and decorated with an anthropomorphic, red moon. This image has its origin in 1751, though it was used as a municipal coat of arms from 1913 to 1979 without the moon. The moon was re-added to the blazon in 1979, and this change was approved by the Ludwigsburg district office on 8 April 1980. A corresponding municipal flag was also issued.

Transportation
Erligheim is connected to Germany's network of roadways by the Bundesstraße 27. Local public transportation is provided by the Verkehrs- und Tarifverbund Stuttgart.

References

External links

  (in German)

Ludwigsburg (district)
Württemberg